Ivaylo Brusowski is a movie director, actor, screen and playwright and composer.

Family origin and early life
Brusowski is the son of Dora Ivanova, a ballerina and the actor, Nikolay Angelov ("Notes on Bulgarian Uprisings", "Mass Miracle" (1981), "Mister for a Day" (1983), "Margarit and Margarita" (1989) and so on). Brusowski has two children, Alice and Dorothy.
Brusowski's first stage appearance was at the age of three in "Richard III" by William Shakespeare. As a child, he played many roles on the stage of the Ruse Theatre, and recorded at the studios of the actor Kosyo Stanev's student theatre. As five- or six-year-old, Brusovski wrote a movie script and used a movie camera.

Education
Brusowski was in the navy. On his dismissal, he studied Business and Management at the Ruse University. He also worked at RRTV, the Bulgarian national broadcaster and completed a course in art photography. From 1996 to 2000, Brusowski studied at The National Academy for Theatre and Film Arts becoming an actor. In 2008, he graduated in Saint Petersburg as a film and TV director.

Career
On November 11, 2001 Brusovski opened his own acting school. He is the creator of the story about W.G.C.,  the Walkman Garden Club and its characters. In 2010 he was appointed head of the School of Acting Drama Theatre in Targovishte.

Plays
 The Long Way to The Cherry Orchard (2012)
 WGC I - The 9th kilometer (2007)
 The Black Obelisk - dramatization of the novel by Erich Maria Remarque (2005)
 Hawaiian hole (2004)
 Don Quixote de la macho (2003)
 WGC III - X Rated Adults ! (2003)
 H. P. like Harry Potter (2002)
 WGC II - Picnic on Uneven Ground (2002)
 Action in the Fairy Forest (2001)

Music for theatrical productions
 I Want ! by Zdrava Kamenova, director Vladimir Petkov
 Six Kisses by Anna Petrova, director Vladimir Petkov
 Escape the fairy world by Dimitar Dimitrov, director Nadia Assenova
 Gentlemen, comrades, dudes and ladies by Victor Lyapin, director Vladimir Petkov
 The party by Zlatka Keremedchieva, director Iskra Ivanova
 Bean by Elin Rahnev, director  Vladimir Petkov.
 Vernissage by Václav Havel, director Nikolay Gunderov

Stage roles
 The Man in I Want ! by Zdrava Kamenova, director Vladimir Petkov
 Waller in Tartuffe by Molière, director Aleksander Berowski
 Eddie Malone in the musical Touch Me by Anna Petrova, director Lyubomir Kanev
 Max in Let's kill Matilda by Orlin Dyakov, director Rosina Danchenko
 The Artist in Painting by Eugène Ionesco, director Ivan Samokovliev
 The Yoke in Attempt to Fly by Jordan Radichkov, director Aleksander Berowski
 Vicho in Michal Mishkoed by Sava Dobroplodni, director Aleksander Berowski
 Costard in Love's Labour's Lost by William Shakespeare, director Aleksander Berowski
 Vicho, the process server in Suspicious person by Branislav Nushich, director Dimitar Stoyanov
 Andrew Benkov in Iron Candlestick by Dimitar Talev, director Asen Shopov
 Lazarus (in summer) in Lazaritza by Jordan Radichkov, director Aleksander Berowski
 The Colleague in The Predetermined by Elias Canetti, director Elena Panayotova
 The Driver in Six Kisses by Anna Petrova, director Vladimir Petkov
 The Investigator in The Part by Zlatka Keremedchieva, director Iskra Ivanova
 Man in Bean by Elin Rahnev, director Nikolay Gunderov

Film roles
 Armstrong directed by Menahem Golan and starring Joe Lara, Frank Zagarino, Kimberley Kates and Charles Napier
 Article 116 and without possibility of parole directed by Valentin Gonevski
 When Nietzsche Wept directed by Pinchas Perry and starring Ben Cross, Armand Assante and Joanna Pacula

Scriptwriter
 Parallel Worlds I: Star Uprise
 WGC II - Picnic on Uneven Ground
 A holiday for billions
 Veseto and the X-crements
 The Alchemists from the west coast
 Vessy and the black and white happiness
 The Becky Thatcher Story
 Thirst

Director
 Parallel Worlds I: Star Uprise, Filming (2014)
 Veseto and the X-crements, Short (2013)
 Thirst, Short (2010)
 The Becky Thatcher Story, Short (2010)
 Norway Today, Short (2010)
 Veseto and the black and white happiness, Short (2009)

Other
Production coordinator for East Europe in * Autómata , Film (2014)

References

External links
 
 https://www.imdb.com/title/tt1971325/?ref_=nv_sr_1
 http://www.ruseinfo.net/news_49362.html
 https://web.archive.org/web/20110708205416/http://crossword.crozzword.com/blog/scena-na-krystopyt-programa-383/
 http://www.teatri.bg/news.php?newsid=250
 http://www.ruseinfo.net/afish_4663.html
 http://www.moreto.net/events.php?n=35063
 http://da-dk.facebook.com/group.php?gid=102015121773
 https://web.archive.org/web/20110720172034/http://www.rusenews.eu/news/3836
 http://www.vesti.bg/?tid=40&oid=862093

Living people
Bulgarian film directors
1968 births